Adams Run is an unincorporated community and census-designated place (CDP) in Charleston County, South Carolina, United States. It was first listed as a CDP in the 2020 census with a population of 421.

Adams Run has a post office with ZIP code 29426, which opened on August 15, 1843.

Christ Church 
Christ Church is one of the oldest churches in Adams Run, SC. It's located just a few hundred yards away from the post office. While the congregation was organized around 1835, this church was not constructed until after the Civil War. Completed in 1887, it was built using materials from the first church, which was located at nearby Willtown Bluff, an historic settlement.

In 1962 Christ Church merged with another church, St. Paul’s in Meggett. The consolidated church was called ChristSt. Paul's Episcopal Church. The congregation is now an Anglican parish and worships in a new sanctuary across from the historic St. Paul's; the new sanctuary was completed in 2008.

Although regular Sunday services are no longer held in the Adams Run church, ChristSt. Paul's Church often opens the historic sanctuary for special occasions. Christ Church at Adams Run, as well as its grounds and graveyard, are maintained by Christ St.Paul's.

Notable Places 
The Barnwell House, Grove Plantation, King Cemetery, Summit Plantation House, Wilkinson-Boineau House, and Willtown Bluff are listed on the National Register of Historic Places.

Demographics

2020 census

Note: the US Census treats Hispanic/Latino as an ethnic category. This table excludes Latinos from the racial categories and assigns them to a separate category. Hispanics/Latinos can be of any race.

Sources

 U.S. Geological Survey. Best Practices National Structures Dataset. https://web.archive.org/web/20090825115836/http://bpgeo.cr.usgs.gov/. 30-Jul-2008.
 Adams Run, Geographic Names Information System, U.S. Geological Survey.

Unincorporated communities in Charleston County, South Carolina
Unincorporated communities in South Carolina
Census-designated places in Charleston County, South Carolina
Census-designated places in South Carolina